The 1947–48 season was the 25th season of the Slovenian Republic League and the third as a part of SFR Yugoslavia.

Final table

Qualification for the Yugoslav Second League

External links
Football Association of Slovenia 

Slovenian Republic Football League seasons
Yugo
3
Football
Football